Nielsen Prize may refer to:

Carl Nielsen Prize, named for Carl Nielsen
Ebbe Nielsen Prize
Flora Nielsen Recital Prize
Aarhus International Piano Competition